The 1990 Hawaii gubernatorial election was Hawaii's ninth gubernatorial election.  The election was held on November 6, 1990, and resulted in a victory for the Democratic candidate, incumbent Governor John D. Waiheʻe III over the Republican candidate, State Representative Fred Hemmings.  Waihee received more votes than Hemmings in every county in the state.

Primaries
Primary elections were held on September 22, 1990.

Democratic Primary
Candidates and primary votes:
John D. Waihee III, governor: 88.48%
Benjamin Hopkins: 4.80%
Robert H. Garner: 4.49%
Elbert Marshall: 2.23%

Republican Primary
Candidates and primary votes:
Fred Hemmings, state representative: 90.08%
Leonard Mednick: 3.12%
Charles Hirayasu: 2.43%
Ichiro Izuka: 1.96%
Herman P. U'o: 1.38%
Robert Measel, Jr.: 1.04%

General election

References

1990
1990 United States gubernatorial elections
1990 Hawaii elections